Virginia Ruano Pascual and Paola Suárez were the defending champions, but did not compete this year.

Émilie Loit and Åsa Svensson won the title by defeating Petra Mandula and Patricia Wartusch 6–3, 6–1 in the final. It was the 6th title for Loit and the 15th title for Svensson in their respective doubles careers.

Seeds

Draw

Draw

References
 Tournament Profile (ITF)

2003 Abierto Mexicano Telefonica Movistar
Doubles